The Arab Under 17 Women's Cup (Arabic: كأس العرب للفتيات تحت 17 سنة) is an international football competition organised by the Union of Arab Football Associations, contested by the national women's teams under 17 in the Arab World. The first edition was hosted in Qatar in 2015, with Lebanon being crowned champions.

History
The first edition was hosted by Qatar in 2015. It was organized by the Qatar Women's Sports Committee (QWSC) and the Qatar Football Association under the auspices of the Union of Arab Football Associations (UAFA).

Results

Performance by nation

Participating teams

References

External links
 كأس العرب للفتيات تحت 17 سنة 2015 - UAFA official website

 
Union of Arab Football Associations competitions
International association football competitions in Africa
Women's international association football competitions
Under-17 association football